Lindsay Davenport and Lisa Raymond were the defending champions, but Davenport did not compete this year in order to focus on the singles tournament.

Raymond teamed up with Rennae Stubbs and won the title by defeating Cara Black and Martina Navratilova 6–2, 6–4 in the final.

Seeds

Draw

Draw

References

External links
 Official Results Archive (ITF)
 Official Results Archive (WTA)

Porsche Tennis Grand Prix – Doubles
2003 Doubles